Nina Simone Sings Ellington is an album by American singer and pianist Nina Simone. The album contains songs that were originally composed and recorded by Duke Ellington. Simone is complemented by the Malcolm Dodds Singers.

About the cover 
The cover photo features just Nina Simone's head in full colour. Nina says about this picture in her autobiography I Put a Spell on You (1992)  that the picture was originally a full size picture of Simone's body. However, because Nina was pregnant with her daughter Lisa at that time, the photographer tried various positions to hide Nina's stomach. He failed in this most probably, and that is why just Simone's head was used out of the full picture.

A leftover shot of Nina from this session, featuring a pose from her chest up, was later used on her 1966 album, Nina Simone with Strings.

Track listing 
 "Do Nothin' Till You Hear from Me" (Bob Russell) - 2:50
 "I Got It Bad (And That Ain't Good)" (Paul Francis Webster) - 4:06
 "Hey, Buddy Bolden" (Billy Strayhorn) - 2:28
 "Merry Mending" - 2:35
 "Something to Live For" (Strayhorn) - 2:55
 "You Better Know It" - 2:24
 "I Like the Sunrise" - 3:01
 "Solitude" (Eddie DeLange, Irving Mills) - 3:45
 "The Gal from Joe's" (Mills) - 2:08
 "Satin Doll" (instrumental) (Johnny Mercer, Strayhorn) - 3:37
 "It Don't Mean a Thing (If It Ain't Got That Swing)" (Mills)  2:33

All songs composed by Duke Ellington, lyricists and co-composers indicated.

References 

1962 albums
Nina Simone albums
Albums arranged by Nina Simone
Colpix Records albums